Antigua and Barbuda requires its residents to register their motor vehicles and display vehicle registration plates. Current plates are North American standard 152 × 300 mm (6 × 12 inches). The colour of the characters and the background identifies the type of vehicle it is. For example, A identifies private vehicles.

References

Antigua and Barbuda
Transport in Antigua and Barbuda
Antigua and Barbuda transport-related lists